Jean-Yves Touzaint (born 8 October 1948) is a French equestrian. He competed in two events at the 1976 Summer Olympics.

References

1948 births
Living people
French male equestrians
Olympic equestrians of France
Equestrians at the 1976 Summer Olympics
Place of birth missing (living people)